John Hendrie (born 11 June 1953) is a former Australian rules footballer who played with Hawthorn in the VFL during the 1970s.

Hendrie attended Scotch College, Melbourne from 1968 to 1971 and was a member of the first XVIII for three years, being vice-captain of the premiership winning side in his final year of school.

A half forward, Hendrie was a good mark and had a sweeping left foot kick. Hendrie kicked 2 goals 8 behinds in the 1976 Grand Final.

He finished equal third in the 1975 Brownlow Medal count and his highest scoring season was 52 goals in 1977. A dual premiership player with Hawthorn in 1976 and 1978, Hendrie also represented Victoria in state of origin matches in 1977 and 1978.

His struggled to get a senior game with Hawthorn in the last two years of his career, playing 8 games in 1981 and only one in 1982. He had offers to join Footscray but took the advice of Allan Jeans to finish his VFL career at Hawthorn. After business took him to Sydney, he played with the North Shore Australian Football Club in the Sydney competition.

Honours and achievements 
Hawthorn
 2× VFL premiership player: 1976, 1978
 Minor premiership: 1975

Individual
 Hawthorn life member

References

External links

1953 births
Living people
People educated at Scotch College, Melbourne
Australian rules footballers from Victoria (Australia)
Hawthorn Football Club players
Hawthorn Football Club Premiership players
North Shore Australian Football Club players
Two-time VFL/AFL Premiership players